State Road 544 (SR 544) is a west–east state road in the U.S. state of Florida. It runs  from Auburndale to Haines City.

Route description
SR 544 breaks off at a diagonal from U.S. Route 92 (US 92) in Auburndale and heads east-southeast toward Winter Haven as Havendale Boulevard; the name derives from the two cities it connects. In Winter Haven, it straightens out eastward as Avenue T North, conforming to Winter Haven's systematic road-naming grid plan.

As SR 544 leaves Winter Haven, it becomes Lucerne Park Road, also going by the title Scenic Highway. It winds north and east around Lake Conine, Lake Smart, and Lake Fannie, and bypasses the community of Lucerne Park, on its way toward southern Haines City. SR 544 crosses US 27 and enters the Haines City city limits shortly afterward, passing by a landmark tall-steepled First Presbyterian Church. SR 544 also bypasses Alta Vista Elementary School, then intersects with SR 17; the Haines City Post Office marks a corner of this junction.  SR 544 ends at SR 17; across this intersection is County Road 544 (CR 544), which leads toward Grenelefe.

Major intersections

Related roads

County Road 544

County Road 544 (CR 544) exists in two separate places:
One segment has both termini on Lucerne Park Road (SR 544).  Known as Old Lucerne Park Road, it runs parallel to SR 544 and leads to some residential areas between Lake Haines and Lake Henry.
The easternmost segment, known as Lake Marion Road, picks up where SR 544 leaves off in Haines City and runs east from SR 17 toward Grenelefe, ending at Lake Marion.

County Road 544A

County Road 544A (CR 544A), called Derby Avenue, serves as a sort of extension of SR 544 to the west.  Its western terminus is Recker Highway (SR 655) in western Auburndale; it then runs parallel to US 92 until reaching SR 544 just east of its junction with US 92.

References

External links

544
544
SR 544